Arlington Assembly is a General Motors automobile factory located in Arlington, Texas. The plant has operated for more than 60 years and today manufactures large SUVs from GM's divisions Chevrolet, GMC and Cadillac.

History 

The Arlington plant was opened in 1954 to assemble both automobiles and aircraft, but has focused on the former use for most of its history. Early automobile production included models like the Chevrolet Bel Air and Pontiac Chieftain.  The factory would continue to produce many large GM cars through the 1990s including products from Buick, Oldsmobile, Chevrolet and Cadillac.  Arlington Assembly was the last GM B-body manufacturing facility when GM decided to consolidate operations and convert the plant to SUV production.  The plant occupies 250 acres (1,000,000 square meters).

The first GM factory in the "Dallas-Ft. Worth" area was originally built in 1917 to build the Chevrolet Series 490 and the Chevrolet Series F on the south side of West Seventh Street and Slayton Street just west of Trinity Park. Due to a flood of the Trinity River in 1922 and flood control taxes levied by the local government, GM closed the factory in 1924 and in 1929 Leeds Assembly opened in Kansas City, Missouri. The Chevrolet Motor Company Building in Dallas replaced the Trinity Park facility from 1923 until 1935 and was replaced by the more advanced Arlington Factory in the early 1950s.

Vehicles produced

Current 
Since 2020 (2021 model year), Arlington Assembly manufactures large SUVs based on GM's GMT T1XX platform:
 Chevrolet Tahoe/GMC Yukon
 Chevrolet Suburban/GMC Yukon XL
 Cadillac Escalade/Cadillac Escalade ESV
 GMC Yukon Denali/GMC Yukon XL Denali

Former 

RWD GM B platform vehicles
 Buick Roadmaster (1991–1996)
 Chevrolet Caprice  (1966–1996)
 Chevrolet Impala SS (1994–1996)
 Oldsmobile Custom Cruiser (1988–1990)
RWD GM A platform vehicles
 Chevrolet Chevelle SS (1970-1972) - Some SS models were painted a shade of yellow shared with some Oldsmobiles and used a different sequential production number unlike other Chevelles produced at other GM assembly plants
 Chevrolet Malibu (1978–1981)
 Chevrolet Monte Carlo (1970–1981)
 Oldsmobile Cutlass 1968-1981
RWD GM G platform vehicles
 Buick Regal (1982–1983)
 Chevrolet Malibu (1982–1983)
 Chevrolet Monte Carlo (1982–1987)
 Oldsmobile Cutlass Supreme (1979-1981, 1984–1987)
RWD GM D platform vehicles
 Cadillac Brougham (1988–1992)
 Cadillac Fleetwood (1993–1996)
GMT400 light trucks (1999-2000)
GMT800 sport utilities (1999-2005)
GMT900 sport utilities (2006–2014)
GMT K2XX sport utilities (2015–2020)

References

External links
 

General Motors factories
Motor vehicle assembly plants in Texas
Economy of Arlington, Texas
1954 establishments in Texas